Le Verdier (meaning the orchard) is a commune in the Tarn department in southern France.

Geography
The Vère flows west-southwestward through the southern part of the commune.

See also
Communes of the Tarn department

References

Communes of Tarn (department)